Hawa Cissoko (born 10 April 1997) is a French professional footballer who plays as a defender for English FA Women's Super League club West Ham United and the France national team. She also holds Malian citizenship.

Early life 
Cissoko was born in Paris on 10 April 1997. She is one of 15 children. She begun her football career as a 12 year old in when she joined FC Solitaire. She was then invited to joined Paris Saint-Germain youth team in 2012.

Club career 
Cissoko made her senior career debut for Paris Saint Germain during the 2014–15 season. She went on to join Olympique de Marseille in 2017. After a lone season with Marseille, she transferred to ASJ Soyaux in 2018. She joined West Ham United in July 2020. On 15 October 2022, she was involved in an on-field scuffle in which she struck an opposing player in a league match against Aston Villa. She was subsequently banned for five matches as a result. On 11 December 2022, Cissoko scored her first senior career goal in a 2–0 league win against Tottenham Hotspur.

International career
Cissoko represented France at the 2016 FIFA U-20 Women's World Cup. She has appeared twice for Les Bleues at senior level in 2017, both matches being friendly: on 18 September in a 1–1 draw against Spain and on 20 October 2017 in a 1–0 win against England.

By July 2020, after moving to England, Cissoko has expressed her desire to switch her international allegiance and play for Mali.

Personal life 
Cissoko is a Muslim. She made the decision in January 2021 to wear the hijab, only removing it during matches.

Career statistics

Club

International

References

External links

 
 

1997 births
Living people
Footballers from Paris
Black French sportspeople
French sportspeople of Malian descent
French women's footballers
Women's association football defenders
France women's youth international footballers
UEFA Women's Euro 2022 players
Division 1 Féminine players
Paris Saint-Germain Féminine players
Olympique de Marseille (women) players
ASJ Soyaux-Charente players
West Ham United F.C. Women players
France women's international footballers
French expatriate women's footballers
French expatriate sportspeople in England
Expatriate women's footballers in England